The 2010 European F3 Open Championship was the second European F3 Open Championship season. The season began on 17 April at Circuit Ricardo Tormo in Valencia, and finished on 31 October at Circuit de Catalunya in Montmeló after 16 races run at eight meetings, four held in Spain, as well as meetings held in Belgium, France, the United Kingdom and Italy.

Marco Barba, the 2007 series runner-up, finished the season as champion for the Lebanese team Cedars Motorsport, having clinched the title with a meeting to spare at Jerez. Barba, who stepped down from the Formula Renault 3.5 Series to contest the series, won six races and collected eleven podiums as he finished more than 40 points clear of the field. Second place was claimed by Team West-Tec's Callum MacLeod via countback, having finished tied on points with RP Motorsport's David Fumanelli. Both drivers could not be separated on victories, as they each won three races, but MacLeod's four second places enabled to finish ahead of Fumanelli, who claimed just one runner-up placing. Kevin Ceccon and Toño Fernández completed the top five in the championship standings, each taking one victory during the season, coming at Catalunya and Brands Hatch respectively. The two other race victors came from the secondary Copa de España class, with Drivex driver Aaron Filgueira winning at Spa-Francorchamps, and MacLeod's team-mate Victor Corrêa won at Monza, having moved up from Formula Renault UK midway through the season.

Cedars Motorsport also triumphed in the Copa de España for older-specification machinery. Noel Jammal finished the season with five victories, and finished at the head of the standings by five points. Title rival Filgueira had led the standings by three points heading into the final race weekend in Catalunya, but a double retirement coupled with Jammal's second place in the opening race allowed the Lebanese driver to top the points at season's end; he claimed four wins and ten podiums, and managed to just fend off Luis Villalba of the Hache Team by four points, a winner of three races. Nil Montserrat, Corrêa (2) and Vincent Beltoise took the season's other victories. Cedars Motorsport completed a clean sweep, winning the teams' championship by 24 points ahead of Team West-Tec and 25 clear of RP Motorsport.

Teams and drivers
 All cars were powered by Toyota engines. Main class powered by Dallara F308, while Copa Class by Dallara F306 chassis.
{|
|

Race calendar and results
 The calendar was announced by the FIA on December 18, 2009. The calendar was later amended on February 8, 2010.

Championship standings

Class A
Points were awarded as follows:

Copa F306/300
Points were awarded for both races as follows:

Team Standings
 Points for each team's best scoring chassis were awarded for both races as follows:

References

External links
 European F3 Open Official Website

European F3 Open
Euroformula Open Championship seasons
European
Euroformula Open